Zhen Zhen is a female giant panda born  on August 3, 2007, to Bai Yun and Gao Gao at the San Diego Zoo.  Her name means "Precious".  She is Bai Yun's fourth cub, and Gao Gao's third.  Zhen Zhen has one half sibling, Hua Mei, and four full siblings, Mei Sheng, Su Lin, Yun Zi, and Xiao Liwu.  Like her full siblings, Zhen Zhen was conceived via natural mating.

Zhen Zhen made her public debut on December 22, 2007, and was weaned in early 2009.  Zhen Zhen, along with her sister Su Lin, were sent to Bifengxia Panda Base in China on September 24, 2010.

In 2018, Zhen Zhen was released into the wild as part of a research project, with a collar attached to her neck. She walked through a village when finding food, drawing attention from the residents. Zhen Zhen explored for several hours, before being sedated and brought back to the Wolong Shensuping Panda Base. Wu Daifu, the director of the Hetaoping panda training base said in a phone interview with China Central Television that the base allows Zhen Zhen out of her enclosure to possibly mate with wild pandas.

Notes

External links
 Zhen Zhen's San Diego Zoo Profile
 San Diego Zoo Giant Panda Research Station

Individual giant pandas
2007 animal births
San Diego Zoo